Yanping East railway station is a railway station in Yanping District, Nanping, Fujian, China.

History
On 11 December 2019, the name of this station was changed from Nanping South to Yanping East.

References

Railway stations in Fujian